Telstar 2 was a communications satellite launched by NASA on May 7, 1963. It remained active for 2 years. 
Telstar 2 remains in orbit.

History 
Telstar 2, primarily a communications satellite, carried an experiment designed to measure the energetic proton and electron distribution in the Van Allen belts. The spacecraft spin axis shortly after launch was about 80 deg to the ecliptic plane. The initial spin rate was 180 rpm, and it varied slowly over the life of the spacecraft. Telstar 2 was essentially identical to the Telstar 1 satellite. It employed two transmitters, and data were telemetered via a PCM/FM/AM encoder. The telemetry sequence required about 1 min. Telstar 2 differed from Telstar 1 by employing provisions for scientific information to be transmitted in real time via the microwave telemetry system so that telemetry could be obtained after the 2 years timer had turned off the VHF beacon. On May 16, 1965, at 1403 UT, during the satellite's 4736 orbit, the VHF transmitter was turned off. All systems operated normally until that time.

The satellite was launched into space on May 7, 1963, on a Delta-B rocket from the Cape Canaveral Air Force Station in Florida, United States. The European receiving station for Telstar 2 was built in Brittany, France, near the village of Pleumeur-Bodou, at which the 340-ton pivotally mounted antenna sits under a 50-meter diameter radar dome. These buildings still exist as part of a communications museum. The transmissions were not continuous, being restricted to 25–30 minutes, since the low orbit of the satellite made it difficult for the receiving and transmitting antennas to pick up its signal.

See also 
 Telstar
 American Telephone and Telegraph

References 

1963 in spaceflight
Telstar satellites